Joseph Tomlinson may refer to:
 Joseph Tomlinson (railway engineer), British railway engineer and executive
 Joseph Tomlinson (civil engineer), British-born Canadian-American bridge and lighthouse engineer

See also
 Joe Tomlinson, English footballer